Steve Craven (born 17 September 1957, Birkenhead) is a footballer who played as midfielder for Tranmere Rovers and Crewe Alexandra.

References

1957 births
Living people
Sportspeople from Birkenhead
Association football midfielders
English footballers
Tranmere Rovers F.C. players
Crewe Alexandra F.C. players
Northwich Victoria F.C. players
Altrincham F.C. players
Bangor City F.C. players
Caernarfon Town F.C. players
English Football League players